Ihor R. Lemischka, Ph.D. was an internationally recognized stem cell biologist and stem cell research advocate and was both the Lillian and Henry M. Stratton Professor of Gene and Cell Medicine and Director of the Black Family Stem Cell Institute at Mount Sinai Medical Center in New York City.

His work with hematopoietic stem cells (HSC) was the first to identify their novel receptor tyrosine kinases and showed that HSC can rebuild all blood cell types in a mouse whose blood cells had been destroyed.

He authored over 70 book chapters and publications in peer-reviewed journals.

Biography

Education and post-doctoral training
Lemischka graduated from Johns Hopkins University in 1976 and earned his Ph.D in biology from MIT in 1983. He did his post-doctoral training at MIT's Whitehead Institute.

Academic appointments
Lemischka joined Princeton University in 1986 as Assistant Professor of Molecular Biology; he became Professor in 2002. In 2007, he joined the staff at Mount Sinai Medical Center, where he was Professor of Gene and Cell Medicine and Director of the Black Family Stem Cell Institute.

Affiliations and awards
Lemischka was a board member of the International Society for Stem Cell Research, the Journal of Visualized Experiments (JoVE) and the New York Stem Cell Foundation.
His awards included a Damon Runyon-Walter Winchell Postdoctoral, a Leukemia Social Special Fellowship, an American Cyanamid Preceptorship Award and the DuPont Young Faculty Grant.
He was a journal reviewer for Cell, Science, Nature, Nature Genetics, Nature Immunology, Nature Biotechnology, Proceedings of the National Academy of Sciences, Public Library of Science, Development, Genes & Development, Journal of Clinical Investigation and Blood.

Patents
Lemischka held or had patents pending for the following:

Areas of concentration
Lemischka's interests included defining the cellular and molecular mechanisms that control cell fate decisions in embryonic stem cells. Research into mouse embryonic stem cells was aggressively studied in the embryonic stem cells of humans.

Publications
Partial List:
Fasano C, Dimos JT, Ivanova NB, Lowry N, Lemischka IR, Temple S. shRNA knockdown of Bmi-1 reveals a critical role for p21/Rb pathway in NSC self-renewal during development. Cell Stem Cell 2007; 1: 87-99.  
Ivanova N, Dobrin R, Lu R, Kotenko I, Levorse J, DeCoste C, Schafer X, Lun Y, Lemischka IR. Dissecting self-renewal in stem cells with RNA interference. Nature 2006; 442: 533-538. 
Moore KA, Lemischka IR. Stem cells and their niches. Science 2006; 311: 1880-1885. 
Schaniel C, Li F, Schafer X, Moore T, Lemischka I, Paddison P. Delivery of short hairpin RNAs-triggers of gene silencing into mouse embryonic stem cells. Nature Methods 2006; 3: 6946-6951. 
Pritsker M, Ford N, Jenq H, Lemischka IR. Genome-wide gain-of-function genetic screen identifies functionally active genes in mouse embryonic stem cells. Proc. Natl, Acad Sci USA 2006; 103: 6946-6951. 
Shen Q, Wang Y, Dimos JT, Fasano CA, Phoenix TN, Lemischka IR, Ivanova NB, Stifani S, Morrisey EE, Temple S. The timing of cortical neurogenesis is encoded within lineages of individual progenitor cells. Nat Neurosci. 2006; 9: 743-751. 
Pritsker M, Doniger T, Kramer L, Westcot S, Lemischka IR, . Diversification of stem cell molecular repertoire by alternative splicing. Proc. Natl. Acad. Sci. USA 2005; 102: 14290-14295.  
Ivanova NB, Dimos JT, Schaniel C, Hackney JA, Moore KA, Lemischka IR. A stem cell molecular signature. Science 2002; 298: 601-604. 
Phillips RL, Ernst RE, Brunk B, Ivanova N, Mahan MA, Deanehan JK, Moore KA, Overton GC, Lemischka IR. The Genetic Program of Hematopoietic Stem Cells. Science 2000; 288: 1635-1640.  
Petrenko O, Beavis A, Klaine M, Godin I, Lemischka IR. The molecular characterization of the fetal stem cell marker AA4. Immunity 1999; 10: 691-700.

References

External links
Mount Sinai Hospital homepage
Mount Sinai School of Medicine homepage
Control and Regulation of Stem Cells – interview with Catherine Cormier, SciVee
Dissecting Cell Fate Regulation in Stem Cells, YouTube
Stem Cell Research: An NPR Special Report, National Public Radio
Stem Cells Meet Systems Biology, Nature Reports
Princeton scientists explore the next frontier of stem cell research, Princeton Weekly Bulletin
No Stem Cell Left Behind, New York Times

21st-century American biologists
American medical academics
Icahn School of Medicine at Mount Sinai faculty
Stem cell researchers
American people of Belarusian descent
Living people
Year of birth missing (living people)